The Grace Protestant Episcopal Church is a historic church building in Red Cloud, Nebraska. It was built in 1884, and designed in the Gothic Revival architectural style. Reverend Mr Crockett oversaw its construction, and the building was moved to its current location in 1891. In 1922, author Willa Cather stopped attending the First Baptist Church and began attending this church. When the Munich-style stained glass was added in the 1930s, Cather dedicated a window to her mother and another one to her father. The building has been listed on the National Register of Historic Places since February 11, 1982.

References

National Register of Historic Places in Webster County, Nebraska
Gothic Revival architecture in Nebraska
Churches completed in 1891
Willa Cather